The Battle of Pteria was fought in 547 BC between the Persian forces of Cyrus the Great and the Lydian forces of Croesus. Both armies suffered heavy casualties in this indecisive battle.

Background
Croesus learned of the sudden Persian uprising and defeat of his longtime rivals, the Medes. He attempted to use these set of events to expand his borders upon the eastern frontier of Lydia, by making an alliance with Chaldea, Egypt and  several Greek city-states, including Sparta. Prior to his invasion, Croesus asked the Oracle of Delphi for advice. The Oracle suggested vaguely that, "if King Croesus crosses the Halys River, a great empire will be destroyed." Croesus received these words most favorably, instigating a war that would ironically and eventually end not the Persian Empire but his own.

Croesus began the campaign with an invasion of Cappadocia, crossing the Halys and capturing Pteria, then capital of the district and formidable as a fortress. The city was sacked, and the inhabitants enslaved.

Cyrus advanced to halt the Lydian incursion. He incorporated northern Mesopotamia, while receiving the voluntary capitulation of Armenia, Cappadocia, and Cilicia.

Battle
Both armies met in the vicinity of the fallen city. Cyrus was said to have been heavily outnumbered, with only 25,000 men against what is said to have been near a 100,000 (though this is likely an exaggeration). Fierce urban combat followed, during which Cyrus and Croesus both personally lead teams of troops into the streets of the abandoned city. Cyrus' leadership and bravery, along with the refusal of the Persian Immortals to retreat when pressed, is said to allowed the Persians to hold off. The urban fighting continued till nightfall, but was inconclusive. Both sides sustained considerable casualties; in the aftermath, the outnumbered Croesus withdrew across the Halys. The retreat of Croesus was a strategic decision to suspend operations using winter to his advantage, awaiting the arrival of reinforcements from his allies the Babylonians, the Egyptians and particularly the Spartans. This would prove to have been a mistake, as Cyrus was able to quickly follow in his enemy's wake while the main Persian army (still mustering) assembled.

Aftermath
Despite the arrival of winter, Cyrus continued his march on Sardis.
The dispersal of Croesus' army exposed Lydia to the unexpected winter campaign of Cyrus, who almost immediately followed Croesus back to Sardis. The rival kings fought again at the Battle of Thymbra, before Sardis, which ended in a decisive victory for Cyrus the Great.

Notes

References

Sources

547 BC
Pteria
Achaemenid Cappadocia
Pteria
6th century BC
Pteria